is Japanese idol group AKB48's fifth single, and the third major single released through DefSTAR Records, on April 18, 2007. The title track was sung with 16 members, 14 of whom appeared on the previous single, "Seifuku ga Jama o Suru".

Promotion
The theme of "Keibetsu Shiteita Aijō" is school bullying, which results in suicide by jumping off the school roof. The music video, which is directed by Eiki Takahashi and launched on the SMEJ-owned Music On! TV, starts with following subtitle;

Even the background design of CD jacket was like a newspaper article reporting suicide caused by school bullying.

Each  CD also includes 2 DVDs, one is video clip and the other is "Making of "Keibetsu Shiteita Aijō", as well as following premiums.
 Original Trading Cards (one of 3 different designs)
 A flyer for premium lucky draw application

Reception
The single charted 4 weeks in the top 200 with the highest rank at #8, a week and a rank less than their previous single, "Seifuku ga Jama o Suru". "Keibetsu Shiteita Aijō" sold 22,671 copies.

Personnel
Center: Minami Takahashi
Team A - Tomomi Itano, Haruna Kojima, Atsuko Maeda, Minami Minegishi, Rina Nakanishi, Mai Oshima, Mariko Shinoda, Minami Takahashi,
Team K - Sayaka Akimoto, Tomomi Kasai, Kana Kobayashi, Yuka Masuda, Sae Miyazawa, Erena Ono, Yuko Oshima, Natsuki Sato, Ayaka Umeda

Track listing

Charts

Reported sales

References

External links
  (Sony Music Shop)

AKB48 songs
2007 singles
Songs with lyrics by Yasushi Akimoto
Songs about bullying
Songs about suicide
Defstar Records singles